Three Men in a Cart is a 1929 British silent comedy film directed by Arthur Phillips and starring Frank Stanmore, Joan Morgan and David Dunbar. It was made at Isleworth Studios as a quota quickie for distribution by Universal Pictures. Its plot concerns three friends who discover buried treasure.

Cast
 Frank Stanmore as Hobbs
 Tony Wylde as Charles Stanley
 Pat Morton  as Frank Whiteley
 Joan Morgan
 David Dunbar 
 Celia Hughesden
 Alice O'Day

References

Bibliography
 Chibnall, Steve. Quota Quickies: The Birth of the British 'B' film. British Film Institute, 2007.
 Low, Rachael. History of the British Film: Filmmaking in 1930s Britain. George Allen & Unwin, 1985 .
 Wood, Linda. British Films, 1927-1939. British Film Institute, 1986.

External links

1929 films
1929 comedy films
British comedy films
British silent feature films
Films set in England
Films shot at Isleworth Studios
Films with screenplays by Edward Dryhurst
British black-and-white films
1920s English-language films
1920s British films
Silent comedy films